Andrés Eduardo Serrano Acevedo (born 30 November 1942) is an actor, best known as the evil patron Rogelio Vivas in Coral International telenovela Juana la virgen. He has also participated in many other events. For example, in 1979 he co-presented the eighth edition of the OTI Festival, which was held in Caracas.

Born in Caracas, Venezuela, he has been married three times. He was also married with Carmen Julia Álvarez from 1968 to 1975 and Haidy Velásquez from 1995 to the present. He has two children with Haidy. His children's names are Magaly Andreina, Miguel Eduardo, and Leonardo Andrés.

Filmography

TV series 
 La suerte de Loli (2021)
 La Fan (2017)
 Milagros De Navidad (2017)
 Tomame o Dejame ( 2015)
 Demente Criminal ( 2015) as Andrew Yepez.
 Escandalos: Todo es real, excepto sus nombres (2014-2015)
 El Rostro de la Venganza (2012–2013)
 Natalia del Mar (2011)
 La Mujer Perfecta (2010–2011)
 Si me miran tus ojos (2010)
 Dame Chocolate (2007)
 Ferrando, de pura sangre (2006 miniseries)
 El Desprecio (2006)
 Decisiones (2005)
 El cuerpo del deseo (2005)
 ¡Anita, no te rajes! (2004)
 Juana la virgen (2002)
 Viva la Pepa (2001)
 Soledad (2001)
 Muñeca de trapo (2000)
 Mujercitas (1999)
 Cambio de Piel (1998)
 La Inolvidable (1996)
 Volver a Vivir (1996)
 Piel (1992)
 Emperatriz (1990)
 La Sombra de Piera (1989)
 Amor de Abril (1988)
 Y la luna también (1987)
 Las Amazonas (1985)
 El sol sale para todos (1985)
 Sorangel (1981)
 Andreina (1981)
 Emilia (1980)
 La Zulianita (1977)
 Cumbres borrascosas (1976)
 Mily (1973)

Movies 
 The Celibacy / The Celibacy (2011)
 Tosca, la verdadera historia / Tosca, the True Story (2001)
 Juegos bajo la luna (2000)
 Cangrejo II (1984)

References

External links 
 

1942 births
Living people
OTI Festival presenters
People from Caracas
Venezuelan male telenovela actors